Robert Nold "Red" Byron (March 12, 1915 – November 11, 1960) was an American stock car racing driver, who was successful in NASCAR competition in the sanctioning body's first years. He was NASCAR's first Modified champion (and its first champion in any division) in 1948 and its first Strictly Stock (predecessor to NASCAR Cup Series) champion in 1949.  Along with Bob Flock, he is considered one of the best drivers of the era.  He won the first NASCAR race at Daytona Beach and Road Course and won the inaugural NASCAR Strictly Stock driver's championship.

Background
Born in Washington County, Virginia, he moved to Colorado at a young age, and then to Anniston, Alabama, which he considered his hometown. Byron began racing in 1932 and was successful in racing in Talladega by the start of the 1940s.  His racing career was interrupted when he served in the United States Army Air Forces as a flight engineer on B-24 Liberator bombers during World War II.  During combat, Byron suffered a serious injury to his left leg.  The doctors helped partially heal his leg, but he needed a special setup to race.

Racing career
Before World War II, Byron raced in the AAA Indy series, mainly in Sprint Cars and Midgets. He achieved his first Stock Car victory in July 1941, while on two-day liberty from training with the USAAF, and with the war intervening, did not return to racing for five years.

When he returned from the war, Byron, limp and all, returned to racing, and with the help of race engineer Red Vogt, was still successful. He won his first race following the war at Seminole Speedway, near Orlando, in 1946, beating Roy Hall and Bill France. In 1948, Byron became a part of the newly-formed NASCAR Modified Series racing with Raymond Parks' team.

In 1949, Byron began racing in NASCAR's newly formed Strictly Stock series, which became the Grand National series, Winston Cup, and the modern-day NASCAR Cup Series.  With Parks in tow, Byron was equally successful in the inaugural eight-race season.  Just as in 1948, he won at Daytona Beach, and also won at a dirt track in Martinsville.  Byron, as with his previous year in a modified, ended the year as the series' first champion.

Byron raced sparingly after his two championships.  He owned a sports car racing team for much of the 1950s.

Life after driving
Declining health forced him to hang up his goggles in 1951, but he remained active in racing. He worked with Briggs Cunningham, who was trying to develop an American sports car that could win Grand Prix races, then become manager of a Corvette team with the same goal. Neither project succeeded, but Byron enjoyed sports cars.

On January 19, 2018, Byron was inducted into the NASCAR Hall of Fame's Class of 2018.

Death
When he died of a heart attack in a Chicago hotel room on November 11, 1960, at the age of 45, he was managing a team in the Sports Car Club of America competition.

Motorsports career results

NASCAR
(key) (Bold – Pole position awarded by qualifying time. Italics – Pole position earned by points standings or practice time. * – Most laps led.)

Grand National Series

Awards
Despite his brief career, he was selected to the National Motorsports Hall of Fame in 1966.  In 1998, as part of NASCAR's 50th Anniversary celebration, he was selected as one of NASCAR's 50 Greatest Drivers. He is announced as a 2008 inductee in the International Motorsports Hall of Fame.

He was inducted into the Motorsports Hall of Fame of America on March 17, 2020.

References

External links
 
 Biographical article on TheSpeedBlog.com

1915 births
1960 deaths
Sportspeople from Anniston, Alabama
Racing drivers from Alabama
Racing drivers from Colorado
NASCAR drivers
NASCAR Cup Series champions
United States Army Air Forces personnel of World War II
United States Army Air Forces soldiers
NASCAR Hall of Fame inductees